Who Are You is the eighth studio album by English rock band the Who, released on 18 August 1978 by Polydor Records in the United Kingdom and MCA Records in the United States. Although the album received mixed reviews from critics, it was a commercial success, peaking at number 2 on the US charts and number 6 on the UK charts.

Who Are You was the Who's last album to feature Keith Moon as their drummer, who died three weeks after it was released. The ironic nature of the text "Not to Be Taken Away" that was stencilled on Moon's chair on the album cover was noted by some critics.

Composition

Overview
Who Are You was recorded when punk rock was popular. This is not reflected in the album's music, which incorporates elements of progressive rock and, according to biographer Tony Fletcher, it was produced in such a way as to appeal to commercial rock radio at the time. The album showcased some of Townshend's most complicated arrangements, with multiple layers of synthesizer and strings. Many of the songs also revisited themes from Townshend's long-contemplated Lifehouse project, featuring lyrics about songwriting and music as a metaphor for life, as indicated by titles like "Guitar and Pen", "New Song", "Music Must Change", and "Sister Disco". The latter two, along with "Who Are You", ultimately appeared on Lifehouse Chronicles, Townshend's later actualization of the project. Several of the song's lyrics also reflect Townshend's uncertainty about the Who's continued relevance in the wake of punk rock, and his dissatisfaction with the music industry.

There was a three-year hiatus between Who Are You and the Who's previous album, The Who by Numbers. The band was drifting apart during this period, as band members were working on various solo projects, and Moon was driving deeper into drug and alcohol abuse. The initial sessions at Ramport Studios, produced by Glyn Johns and Jon Astley, were lackadaisical; Jon Astley recalled that "no one wanted to work", and the members looked forward more to drinking and reminiscing at six in the evening. Astley felt that he and Johns pushed Moon too hard to play a simpler style, while Johns believed that Moon had "lost confidence in his ability" and would deliberately go out of his way to resist his suggestions.

Moon's health was especially an object of concern, as his drumming skills had noticeably deteriorated and his performances for most of the sessions were substandard. He was unable to play in 6/8 time on the track "Music Must Change", so the drums were removed completely from the track, and replaced with the sound of footsteps and a few cymbal crashes. Bassist John Entwistle remarked that Moon "couldn't think of anything to play." On another occasion, Astley recalled, "I was doing a drum track, and he hadn't learned the song. I actually had to stand up and conduct. He said, 'Can you give me a cue when you get to the middle part?' [...] He hadn't done his homework." Entwistle similarly described Moon as "really out of condition", and "disgusted with himself" as a result.

The recording was further delayed when lead singer Roger Daltrey underwent throat surgery, and when during a lengthy Christmas break, Townshend sliced his hand in a window during an argument with his parents. Former Zombies and Argent member Rod Argent was also called in to replace session keyboardist John "Rabbit" Bundrick after Bundrick suffered a broken arm falling out of a taxi at the studio door. When the sessions resumed in March, they were moved to RAK Studios, which caused further delays due to the equipment malfunctioning, including the wiping of a backing track. Astley stated that the RAK equipment made the existing material sound different when played back, necessitating further delays as he attempted to fix the audio problems. In one incident, Daltrey punched Johns in the face due to an argument over a rough mix, rendering him unconscious. The argument was fueled by Ted Astley adding a string arrangement to "Had Enough", which Daltrey derided as "slushy". After one long and frustrating day, Townshend planned to fire Moon from the band unless he cleaned up his act. The plan drove Moon to attempt to kick his alcohol habit and work more enthusiastically. Due to a prior commitment to produce the Joan Armatrading album To the Limit, Johns had to leave in April, with Astley remaining as sole producer. Under Astley's command, the sessions returned to Ramport, with all of the drums except for "Who Are You" recorded in the last two weeks of production. Who Are You was released on 18 August 1978.

Moon died on 7 September 1978, just under a month after the album's release; on the cover, he is shown sitting in a chair labelled "Not to be taken away". Photographer Terry O'Neil had insisted Moon sit with the back of the chair facing the camera so as to hide his distended stomach, a result of his alcoholism.

"Sister Disco"

"Sister Disco" seemed to mourn the death of disco, although it could be construed to be a criticism of it. It featured complicated synthesiser tracks that were the result of hours Townshend spent programming an ARP 2600 synthesiser.

The song was never performed with Moon. However, it was performed regularly when the Who toured with Kenney Jones as drummer, and quickly became a live favourite. It was included on the band's 2002 Ultimate Collection album. It was also revived for their fall 2008 tour.

"Empty Glass"
The song "Empty Glass" appeared as a bonus track on reissues of the album. The lyrics in this version were notable for having more suicidal undertones than those in the final version, which appeared on Pete Townshend's 1980 solo studio album Empty Glass. Most notably, the line, "Killing each other, then we jump off the ledge" was changed to "Killing each other by driving a wedge" for the latest version.

Reception

The album was a commercial success, going 2× platinum in the US and Canada, gold in UK, and peaking at number 2 on the Billboard Pop Albums chart. The soundtrack to Grease prevented Who Are You from achieving number 1 status in the US. The success of Who Are You generated excitement at the prospect of a new Who tour for the album. The songs on the album were later performed on tour in 1979, when the Who were joined by new drummer Kenney Jones and keyboardist John Bundrick.

Reviewing in Christgau's Record Guide: Rock Albums of the Seventies (1981), Robert Christgau said: "Every time I concentrate I get off on some new detail in Daltrey's singing or Townshend's lyrics or Entwistle's bass parts—though not in Moon's drumming, and I still don't relate to the synthesizer. But I never learn anything new, and this is not my idea of fun rock and roll. It ought to be one or the other, if not both."

Live performances
Across the band's entire career, only four of the songs on the album ("Sister Disco", "Music Must Change", "Trick of the Light" and "Who Are You") have been played live.

"Who Are You" was the first of the album's songs to be performed live; this was at a concert in the band's 1976 tour at the Maple Leaf Gardens in Toronto, Ontario, albeit in a very raw and abbreviated version extremely different from the finished product. Another early and abbreviated live performance with Moon can be found on the DVD The Who at Kilburn: 1977. It was also played as part of the encore for the Who's 2012 "Quadrophenia and More" tour.

On the Who's 1979 tour, only four songs were played live: "Sister Disco", "Music Must Change", "Trick of the Light", and "Who Are You". On that tour, "Sister Disco" was played quite close to the studio version, except that the guitar outro was changed from country-style to a more bluesy one, except in 1989, where Townshend used acoustics, and 2008–09, where he could switch his Fender from 'electric mode' to 'acoustic mode'. Townshend actually stated in an interview that this was one of his least favourite songs to perform live (the other being "Dreaming from the Waist"), as Daltrey encouraged Townshend to share a microphone whilst harmonizing on the final vocal tag, evoking a camaraderie Townshend stated didn't really exist. It was played in the tours of 1979, 1980, 1981, 1982, 1989, 2008 and 2009.

"Music Must Change" was often given an extended workout live, with performances usually ranging from seven to nine minutes. It was played in the 1979, 1980 and 1981 tours; it was rehearsed for the 2002 tour, but Entwistle died before the start of that tour and the band were not able to perform the song.

The Who have not been known to play "New Song", "Had Enough", "905", "Guitar and Pen", and "Love Is Coming Down". However, the John Entwistle Band used to play the Entwistle-penned songs.

Re-releases
In 1985, MCA Records released the album on CD. There were no extra tracks on this CD, as it only contained songs from the original LP.

In 1996, the album was reissued on CD. This re-release was remixed and remastered by Jon Astley and Andy Macpherson; some of the elements from the original mixes were eliminated or changed, including an alternate guitar track on "Music Must Change", while other elements were restored, such as "Trick of the Light" being restored to its full length of 4:45. This remaster included five bonus tracks: outtakes "Empty Glass" and "No Road Romance", and alternate mixes for "Guitar and Pen", "Love Is Coming Down", and "Who Are You".

On 24 December 2011, Universal Japan reissued the original analogue mixes of the album on limited, numbered edition SHM-CD, remastered by Jon Astley. The bonus tracks from the 1996 album were also included using vintage mixes where possible; however, the full band version of "No Road Romance" was included instead of Townshend's demo from the 1996 issue. The album was reissued in a miniature replica of the vinyl album for CD. In 2014, the album was released in its original mixes on HDtracks and iTunes, along with the rest of the Who's catalog.

Track listing
All songs written by Pete Townshend, except where noted.

Original LP Release and MCA Records 1985 CD re-release

Personnel

The Who
Roger Daltrey – lead vocals, percussion
Pete Townshend – guitars, backing vocals, piano, synthesizer, lead vocals on "Sister Disco" (bridge), "No Road Romance" and "Empty Glass"
John Entwistle – bass guitar, backing vocals, synthesizer, brass on "Had Enough" and "Music Must Change", lead vocals on "905"
Keith Moon – drums, percussion

Additional musicians
Rod Argent – synthesizer on "Had Enough", piano on "Who Are You", keyboards on "Guitar and Pen" and (uncredited) "Love Is Coming Down"
Ted Astley – string arrangement
Andy Fairweather-Low – backing vocals on "New Song", "Had Enough", "Guitar and Pen", "Love Is Coming Down", and "Who Are You"
Billy Nicholls – backing vocals on "New Song" and "Had Enough"
Michael Nicholls – backing vocals on "Had Enough"
Unknown – drums on "Music Must Change"

Charts

Certifications

References

External links
 

1978 albums
Albums produced by Glyn Johns
Albums produced by Jon Astley
Polydor Records albums
MCA Records albums
The Who albums
Albums produced by Pete Townshend
Albums recorded at RAK Studios
Albums recorded in a home studio
Albums recorded at Olympic Sound Studios